In labour economics, Shapiro–Stiglitz theory of efficiency wages (or Shapiro–Stiglitz efficiency wage model) is an economic theory of wages and unemployment in labour market equilibrium. It provides a technical description of why wages are unlikely to fall and how involuntary unemployment appears. This theory was first developed by Carl Shapiro and Joseph Stiglitz.

Introduction
When full employment is achieved, if a worker is sacked, he automatically finds his next job soon. In the circumstances, he does not need to exert his effort in his job, and thus full employment necessarily motivates a worker to shirk provided that he is happy with loafing on the job. Since shirking makes a firm's productivity decline, the firm needs to offer its workers higher wages to eliminate shirking. Then all firms try to eliminate shirking, which pushes up average wages and decreases employment. Hence nominal wages tend to display downward rigidity. In equilibrium, all firms pay the same wage above market clearing, and unemployment makes job loss costly, and so unemployment serves as a worker-discipline device. A jobless person cannot convince an employer that he works at a wage lower than the equilibrium wage, because the owner worries that shirking occurs after he is hired. As a result, his unemployment becomes involuntary.

No-shirking condition
Suppose utility is a function of wages w and effort e like , and workers maximize the utility function with a discount rate r. 
Then let b be the probability per unit time that a worker is dismissed from his job, and now we introduce the expected lifetime utility  of an unemployed individual. Then we find the asset value of employment during a short interval [0, T] 

because the worker is either dismissed or kept employed during the time. The exponential function appears, because the occasion of dismiss in the interval is once and Poisson distribution is used for the discount rate. Due to the short interval, we approximate the exponential function by 1-rT   

and simple calculation yields

Then we find the fundamental asset equation of a worker:
 
For a nonshirker the equation is
 
and for a shirker 

where q is the probability per unit time that a worker is caught shirking and sacked. Then we see 
 
   
The condition  is called the no-shirking condition (NSC), which is expressed as 

where  is the critical wage. The worker works hard if and only if the NSC is satisfied. Thus if workers get sufficiently high wages, then the NSC is met and they will not shirk. The condition tells us that
 As the critical wage increases, cet.par., the workers exert more effort. 
 As the critical wage increases, cet.par., the expected lifetime utility of an unemployed individual increases.
 As the critical wage increases, cet.par., the probability of being detected shirking decreases.
 As the critical wage increases, cet.par., the discount rate increases. 
 As the critical wage increases, cet.par., the exogenous separation rate increases.

Market equilibrium
Let  be the probability of getting a job per unit time. In equilibrium, the flow into the unemployment pool must be equal to the flow out. Thus the probability is  
   
In reality, an employee is offered his minimum wage  or its equivalent by law. Thus the NSC becomes 
 
and we call it the aggregate NSC. These two yields 
   
This constraint suggests that full employment always should involve shirking.

The aggregate production function  is a function of total effective labour force.

A firm's labour demand is given by equating the cost of hiring an additional employee to the marginal product of labour. This cost consists of wages and future unemployment benefits. Now consider the case where  , then we have   

In equilibrium,  holds, where  is the equilibrium wage.   
Then the equilibrium condition becomes   

This suggests following things.  
Consequently, the wage is unlikely to decrease, and this is a microscopic mechanism of nominal rigidity. Thus, wage cannot decrease so that it can stabilize employment level, and so unemployment must increase during recession.         
As a result, involuntary unemployment occurs.

Job security rules
The level of employment is changed by rules about job security. Consider a firm which consists of an employer and homogeneous employees. Then, suppose the profit of the firm is a function of the level of employment N, the lowest wage  and the level of monitoring M chosen by the employer. 
    
where g(N) is the production function, L is the value of on-the-job leisure from shirking, and p is the probability that an employee is caught shirking and sacked. Assume that the production function has the upper limit and its second derivative with respect to N is negative. Not to mention, the first derivative is positive. That is a reasonable assumption that the function has its upper bound in term of productivity. Consider, for instance, such a function of time as 
     
Obviously its first derivative is positive, and second derivative is negative.

Let R be a measure of the difficulty of dismissing an employee who is caught shirking. Then p is a function of both R and M. The first and second derivatives of the profit with regard to N are:
     

 
Thus differentiating its both sides with regard to R gives us 
 
It turns out that  is negative, which means that the more difficult to sack a shirker the lower employment level.

See also
 Involuntary unemployment 
 Nominal rigidity

References

Microeconomic theories
Unemployment
1984 introductions
1984 in economics